Florin Mădălin Cazan (born 10 May 1997) is a Romanian professional footballer who plays as a midfielder for Sporting Roșiori.

Honours
SCM Gloria Buzău
Liga III: 2018–19

References

External links
 
 

1997 births
Living people
People from Ialomița County
Romanian footballers
Association football midfielders
Liga I players
Liga II players
Liga III players
ASC Daco-Getica București players
AFC Unirea Slobozia players
FC Gloria Buzău players
CSM Focșani players